Yang Terpilih is a studio album by Rossa was released on December 26, 2006 by Trinity Optima Production. The main single of this album is "Terlalu Cinta" where this song won (Anugerah Industri Muzik 15)(Malaysia), "Atas Nama Cinta" (OST. Cinta Fitri), and "Tak Termiliki".

Track listing 
 Terlalu Cinta
 Atas Nama Cinta
 Tak Termiliki
 Pudar
 Perawan Cinta
 Aku Bukan Untukmu
 Sakura
 Kini
 Wanita Yang Kau Pilih
 Malam Pertama
 Tegar
 Hati Yang Terpilih
 Bila Salah
 Nada Nada Cinta

References

External links
 http://musik.kapanlagi.com/berita/meski-hamil-rossa-tetap-luncurkan-album-kbndhx0.html
 http://musik.kapanlagi.com/berita/rossa-luncurkan-album-kompilasi-terbaik-fylu2ur.html

2006 albums
Rossa (singer) albums